Johan Carlsson may refer to:

Johan Carlsson (footballer) (born 1981), Swedish footballer
Johan Carlsson (golfer) (born 1986), Swedish professional golfer
Johan Carlsson (tennis) (born 1966), Swedish tennis player
Johan Carlsson, Swedish keyboardist for the band Carolina Liar